Mohameed Taiwo (born 3 June 2002) is a Nigerian cricketer.

In April 2018, he was the joint-leading wicket-taker in the North-Western group of the 2018–19 ICC World Twenty20 Africa Qualifier tournament, with nine dismissals in five matches. In September 2018, he was named in Nigeria's squad for the 2018 Africa T20 Cup. He made his Twenty20 debut for Nigeria in the 2018 Africa T20 Cup on 14 September 2018.

In March 2019, he was named in Nigeria's squad for the Africa Division 1 qualifier tournament for the 2020 Under-19 Cricket World Cup. In May 2019, he was named in Nigeria's squad for the Regional Finals of the 2018–19 ICC T20 World Cup Africa Qualifier tournament in Uganda. He made his Twenty20 International (T20I) debut for Nigeria against Botswana on 21 May 2019. In October 2019, he was named in Nigeria's squad for the 2019 ICC T20 World Cup Qualifier tournament in the United Arab Emirates.

In December 2019, he was named as the vice-captain of Nigeria's squad for the 2020 Under-19 Cricket World Cup.

References

External links
 

2002 births
Living people
Nigerian cricketers
Place of birth missing (living people)
Nigeria Twenty20 International cricketers